Ngayaw Ake Lin Chih-sheng (born 1 January 1982; birth name: Ngayaw Ake林智盛), also known as Ngayaw Ake in Amis language, is a Taiwanese indigenous baseball player for the Wei Chuan Dragons of the Chinese Professional Baseball League (CPBL). He began his career with the La New Bears in 2004. The team changed its name to the Lamigo Monkeys in 2011, and Lin left after the 2015 season to sign with the CTBC Brothers.

While with the Bears and later Monkeys, Lin and his teammate Shih Chih-wei were often referred to as the "Sheng-Shih Connection," a reference to the glove puppet film Legend of the Sacred Stone. Alone, Lin is nicknamed "Big Brother."

Career
Lin competed at the 2006 Asian Games and had the game-winning hit at the championship game against Japan. In 2008, Lin was chosen to play on the Taiwanese national baseball team at the 2008 Olympic Games. He also played in the 2010 Asian Games, and captained the national team in the inaugural WBSC Premier12 held in November 2015.

He recorded the CPBL's first 30–30 season in 2015, and also won the MVP award that season. On 4 January 2016, Lin signed with the Chinatrust Brothers. He is the first player to change teams since the implementation of free agency in 2010. The three-year deal, worth a guaranteed NT$45 million (US$1.36 million), is the richest in CPBL history, and also includes NT$9 million in incentives.

On April 3, 2022, while playing for the Wei Chuan Dragons, Lin hit his 290th career home run off of Uni-President Lions pitcher Ching-Ming Wang. With the solo blast, Lin set the all-time CPBL home run record.

References

External links

1982 births
2006 World Baseball Classic players
2013 World Baseball Classic players
2015 WBSC Premier12 players
2017 World Baseball Classic players
Amis people
Asian Games gold medalists for Chinese Taipei
Asian Games medalists in baseball
Asian Games silver medalists for Chinese Taipei
Baseball infielders
Baseball players at the 2006 Asian Games
Baseball players at the 2008 Summer Olympics
Baseball players at the 2010 Asian Games
Brisbane Bandits players
CTBC Brothers players
La New Bears players
Lamigo Monkeys players
Living people
Medalists at the 2006 Asian Games
Medalists at the 2010 Asian Games
Olympic baseball players of Taiwan
People from Taitung County
Taiwanese expatriate baseball players in Australia